Waiting, Still is the third extended play by South Korean singer Kyuhyun, a member of Super Junior. It was released on November 10, 2016, by Label SJ, SM Entertainment and distributed by KT Music. The album contains with seven tracks, including the lead singles,  "Blah Blah" and "Still".

Track listing

Charts

Release history

References

SM Entertainment EPs
Korean-language EPs
2016 EPs
Cho Kyuhyun EPs